Carlos Manuel da Silva Cunha (born 6 March 1977), known as Carlitos, is a Portuguese retired footballer who played as a right winger.

He amassed Primeira Liga totals of 260 matches and 30 goals over 16 seasons, mainly with Gil Vicente (six years). He also spent significant time in the competition with Benfica (four seasons) and Vitória de Guimarães (three).

Club career
Born in Barcelos, Carlitos' career was intimately connected with local Gil Vicente FC, which he represented in four separate spells. He made his first-team – and Primeira Liga – debut late into 1994–95 at the age of 18, then proceeded to total a further 58 league appearances in two full seasons.

In 1997, Carlitos joined Real Madrid on a four-year contract, being successively loaned to S.C. Braga, C.F. Estrela da Amadora and Gil Vicente again and never appearing in competitive games for the Spaniards. In the latter campaign, he scored a career-best nine goals as the latter club finished in a best-ever fifth position; his teammates included future Portugal international Petit.

Carlitos then signed with league giants S.L. Benfica, but could never really settle in the starting XI, also being demoted at one point to the reserves. From February 2004 he played for six months in Spain with Polideportivo Ejido, teaming up with former Benfica mate José Calado. He returned to his country and Gil shortly after, spending parts of his last season in the second division and finishing it again in the top tier, with C.F. Os Belenenses.

For 2007–08, Carlitos joined Vitória S.C. upon the Minho side's return to the top flight. He would only be used regularly in the first year – 22 matches, 11 from the bench – helping to a final third position, but gradually lost his importance in the team. In July 2010 he returned to Gil Vicente, aged 33, appearing in 16 games as the club promoted to the top division and retiring shortly after.

Honours
Gil Vicente
Segunda Liga: 2010–11

References

External links

1977 births
Living people
People from Barcelos, Portugal
Portuguese footballers
Association football wingers
Primeira Liga players
Liga Portugal 2 players
Segunda Divisão players
Gil Vicente F.C. players
S.C. Braga players
C.F. Estrela da Amadora players
S.L. Benfica footballers
S.L. Benfica B players
C.F. Os Belenenses players
Vitória S.C. players
Segunda División players
Real Madrid CF players
Polideportivo Ejido footballers
Portugal youth international footballers
Portugal under-21 international footballers
Portugal B international footballers
Portuguese expatriate footballers
Expatriate footballers in Spain
Portuguese expatriate sportspeople in Spain
Sportspeople from Braga District